Parochromolopis floridana is a moth in the family Epermeniidae. It was described by Reinhard Gaedike in 1977. It is found in North America, where it has been recorded from Florida.

References

Moths described in 1977
Epermeniidae
Moths of North America